Stuart Ishmael is a former West Indian cricket umpire. He stood in two Test matches between 1971 and 1974.

See also
 List of Test cricket umpires

References

Year of birth missing (living people)
Living people
Place of birth missing (living people)
West Indian Test cricket umpires